Khandadevi is a Rural municipality located within the Ramechhap District of the Bagmati Province of Nepal.
The municipality spans  of area, with a total population of 25,761 according to a 2011 Nepal census.

On March 10, 2017, the Government of Nepal restructured the local level bodies into 753 new local level structures.
The previous Rakathum, Majhuwa, Bhirpani, Pakarbas, Makadum and Khandadevi, Gagalbhadaure and Piukhuri VDCs were merged to form Khandadevi Rural Municipality.
Khandadevi is divided into 7 wards, with Tokarpur declared the administrative center of the rural municipality.

Demographics
At the time of the 2011 Nepal census, Khandadevi Rural Municipality had a population of 25,786. Of these, 52.0% spoke Nepali, 25.0% Tamang, 13.9% Newar, 3.3% Magar, 3.0% Majhi, 0.8% Thami, 0.1% Maithili and 1.9% other languages as their first language.

In terms of ethnicity/caste, 26.1% were Chhetri, 26.1% Tamang, 22.7% Newar, 7.2% Magar, 6.3% Majhi, 2.9% Kami, 2.7% Damai/Dholi, 2.3% Hill Brahmin, 1.2% Sarki and 2.5% others.

In terms of religion, 70.1% were Hindu, 28.3% Buddhist, 0.9% Prakriti, 0.4% Christian and 0.3% others.

References

External links
official website of the rural municipality

Rural municipalities in Ramechhap District
Rural municipalities of Nepal established in 2017